The Farol da Ponta do Pargo is an active lighthouse located in Ponta do Pargo, Madeira, Portugal. The lighthouse was built in 1922 on top of Ponta Vigia, a rocky cliff escarpment and has a focal height of 312 metres. In 2018 15,301 people visited the lighthouse.

See also

 List of lighthouses in Portugal

References

Lighthouses completed in 1922
Lighthouses in Madeira